Joseph E. Lee (September 15, 1849 – March 25, 1920) was a lawyer, judge, federal official, and Republican politician in Florida. He served six years in the Florida House of Representatives and one term in the Florida State Senate and was also a municipal judge and in various Federal positions in Florida.

Lee was born in Philadelphia. He earned his law degree from Howard University in 1873.

He was a minister in the A.M.E. Church and married a woman named Rosa.

Florida's state archives include a photograph of him. The Jacksonville Historical Society has a collection of his papers. In April 2020, a talk was scheduled at the Jacksonville Historical Society on Lee.

Further reading
Joseph E. Lee of Jacksonville, 1880-1920: African-American Political Leadership in Florida by Gary Vincent Goodwin, Florida State University (1996)

References

Florida state senators
Members of the Florida House of Representatives
1849 births
1920 deaths